AvtoRadio (Russia)
 Autoradio (Belarus)